Omahu is a village in the Hastings District and Hawke's Bay Region of New Zealand's North Island. It is located on State Highway 50, north-west of Hastings on the north bank of the Ngaruroro River.

The New Zealand Ministry for Culture and Heritage gives a translation of "the place where Mahu ran out of food" for Ōmahu. 

A missionary site was established at Omahu in the early 19th century.

Omahu was inundated by flooding during Cyclone Gabrielle in 2023 after the Ngaruroro River burst its banks, destroying dozens of houses.

Marae
The area has two Ngāti Kahungunu marae. Omāhu Marae is a meeting place for Ngāi Te Ūpokoiri, Ngāti Hinemanu, Ngāti Honomōkai and Ngāti Mahuika; it includes the Kahukuranui meeting house. Te Āwhina Marae is a meeting place for Te Ūpokoiri, Ngāti Hinemanu, Ngāti Mahuika; its meeting house has been demolished.

In October 2020, the Government committed $6,020,910 from the Provincial Growth Fund to upgrade a group of 18 marae, including Omāhu Marae. The funding was expected to create 39 jobs.

Education

References

Hastings District
Populated places in the Hawke's Bay Region